The 2016 season will be KR's 102nd season in Úrvalsdeild and their 38th consecutive season in top-flight of Icelandic Football.

Along with the Úrvalsdeild, the club also compete in the Lengjubikarinn, the Borgunarbikarinn and the 2016–17 UEFA Europa League where they entered in the first qualifying round.

Bjarni Guðjónsson will head coach the team for the second season running. He will be assisted by former KR striker Guðmundur Benediktsson.

On 21 April KR won the Icelandic League Cup, Lengjubikarinn, with a 2–0 win against Víkingur R.

On 25 May KR lost to Selfoss in the 3rd round of the Icelandic Cup, Borgunarbikarinn. This was the first time that the team did not qualify through to the 4th round.

First team

Current squad

Transfers and loans

Transfers In

Transfers Out

Loans Out

Pre-season

Reykjavík Cup
KR took part in the 2016 Reykjavík Cup, a pre-season tournament for clubs from Reykjavík.

The team played in Group A along with Leiknir R., Víkingur R., ÍR and Fylkir. KR finished fourth in the group with 6 points and did not make the semi-finals.

Fótbolti.net Cup
KR took part in the 2016 Fótbolti.net Tournament, a pre-season tournament held in January each year.

The team played in Group A along with ÍA, FH and Þróttur R. KR finished top of the group with 9 points and went through to the final.

KR played ÍBV in the final and lost the match 1–2 with Guðmundur Andri scoring KR's only goal.

Lengjubikarinn
KR played in the Icelandic league cup, Lengjubikarinn. They were drawn in Group 3 along with ÍA, Víkingur R., Haukar, HK and Grindavík. KR finished second in the group behind Víkingur R. with 10 points and went through to the quarter-finals.

In the quarter-finals KR played Fylkir who had topped group 2. After a goalless first half KR killed the game off with three goals in a span off 16 minutes in the second half. Morten Beck Andersen opened the scoring in the 50th minute with Óskar Örn doubling the lead in the 57th minute. Morten Beck Andersen then scored his second goal of the night making it 3–0 in the 66th minute.

KR played Keflavík in the semi-finals. KR maintained their good goal scoring form from the quarter-finals and won the game convincingly 4–0. Morten Beck Andersen again scored a brace with Hólmbert Aron and Indriði scoring one each.

On 21 April, KR won the Lengjubikarinn after a 2–0 win against Víkingur R. After a goalless first half Óskar Örn opened the scoring with a headed goal right after the break. He then doubled the scoring with a wonderful shot from his own half over Víkingur's goalkeeper. This was KR's 6th league cup.

Matches

Úrvalsdeild

League table

Matches

Results by matchday

Summary of results

Points breakdown
 Points at home: 8
 Points away from home: 1
 6 Points:
 4 Points:
 3 Points:
 2 Points:
 1 Point: 
 0 Points:

Borgunarbikarinn
KR came into the Icelandic Cup, Borgunarbikarinn, in the 3rd round. The team was drawn against Selfoss who play in the 1. deild karla. KR lost the game 1–2 after extra-time. KR took the lead in the through Denis Fazlagic header on the 61st minute but Selfoss fought back and managed to equalise the game on the 72nd minute. KR had plenty of possession and created many chances but did not manage to find the winning goal so the game went to extra time were Selfoss scored the only goal on the 116th minute and went through to the 4th round, round of 16. This was the first time that KR had been defeated in the 3rd round of the Icelandic Cup.

Matches

Squad statistics

Goalscorers
Includes all competitive matches.

Goalkeeping
Includes all competitive matches.

Appearances
Includes all competitive matches. Numbers in parentheses are sub-appearances.

Disciplinary
Includes all competitive matches.

Squad Stats
Includes all competitive matches; Úrvalsdeild, Borgunarbikar, Lengjubikar and Europa League.
{| class="wikitable" style="text-align:center;"
|-
!  style="background:#000000; color:white; width:150px;"|
!  style="background:#000000; color:white; width:75px;"|Úrvalsdeild
!  style="background:#000000; color:white; width:75px;"|Borgunarbikar
!  style="background:#000000; color:white; width:75px;"|Lengjubikar
!  style="background:#000000; color:white; width:75px;"|Europa League
!  style="background:#000000; color:white; width:75px;"|Total
|-
|align=left|Games played       || 6 || 1 || 8 || 0 || 15
|-
|align=left|Games won         || 2 || 0 || 6 || 0 || 8 (50%)
|-
|align=left|Games drawn        || 3 || 0 || 1 || 0 || 4 (29%)
|-
|align=left|Games lost         || 1 || 1 || 1 || 0 || 3 (21%)
|-
|align=left|Goals scored       || 6 || 1 || 20 || 0 || 27
|-
|align=left|Goals conceded     || 5 || 2 || 5 || 0 || 12
|-
|align=left|Clean sheets       || 2 || 0 || 5 || 0 || 7
|-
|align=left|Yellow cards       || 8 || 3 || 13 || 0 || 24
|-
|align=left|Red cards         || 0 || 0 || 0 || 0 || 0

References

2016 in Icelandic football
Úrvalsdeild karla (football)
Knattspyrnufélag Reykjavíkur seasons
Knattspyrnufélag Reykjavíkur